Juan Heredia Moreno (24 April 1942 – 8 October 2018) was a Spanish professional footballer who played for Mallorca, as a goalkeeper.

References

1942 births
2018 deaths
Spanish footballers
RCD Mallorca players
La Liga players
Segunda División players
Association football goalkeepers
Sportspeople from the Province of Córdoba (Spain)